Never Too Young to Die is a 1986 American action film directed by Gil Bettman. It stars John Stamos as Lance Stargrove, a young man who, with the help of secret agent Danja Deering (played by singer Vanity, also known as Denise Matthews) must avenge the death of his secret-agent father (George Lazenby) at the hands of evil hermaphrodite Velvet Von Ragnar (Gene Simmons).

Plot

Cast
 John Stamos as Lance Stargrove
 Vanity as Danja Deering
 Gene Simmons as Carruthers, Velvet Von Ragnar
 Robert Englund as Riley
 George Lazenby as Drew Stargrove
 Peter Kwong as Cliff
 Ed Brock as Pyramid
 John Anderson as Arliss
 Randy Hall as Minkie
 Branscombe Richmond as Minkie's Partner

Reception
Brian Salisbury of Film School Rejects called Stamos's performance "quite flat and dull. He seems as if he rolled out of bed and directly onto set without having read a single page of the script." He criticized the film's depiction of the punk subculture as inaccurate, but called it "the kind of film that could only exist in the 80s", and noted "Gene Simmons' insane-but-somehow-captivating-in-a-way-that-will-cost-my-therapist-thousands-of-hours-of-his-life performance".

Rob Dean of The A.V. Club called the film "an incredible schlockfest in plot, characterization, and pretty much every other component of filmmaking", and wrote that "it has certainly left an indelible mark on many hearts of those who love cheesy action flicks."

In a retrospective assessment of the film, Stamos has stated: "It's the perfect midnight-movie, where people can come and dress up. It's — what's the term I'm looking for? — the best worst thing you will ever see".

References

External links
 
 
 
 

1980s action drama films
1980s adventure films
Films with screenplays by Lorenzo Semple Jr.
Films scored by Lennie Niehaus
American action adventure films
1986 drama films
1986 films
1980s English-language films
1980s American films